The Donkey Show was a ska band based in San Diego that played  Ska during the eighties. The band was formed in 1985. They introduced many people to ska music and were in the unique position of being one of the founding bands of the "California Ska Sound", a precursor to what some would call the third wave of ska. At one point they even received radio play on major radio stations such as KROQ-FM.

Notability

The Donkey Show were known for their male and female lead vocalists. The group's horn section included saxophonist Dave Hillyard who went on to play with Hepcat, the Slackers and more.  The Donkey Show helped bring the 1960s ska traditional sound to the U.S. and influenced other bands such as the Toasters (Thrill me up), Let's Go Bowling (Rude 69) and Hepcat (then known as Sharpsville Step) to do the same.
The Donkey Show appeared in a Ska Parade video, part of a documentary series that focused on ska bands between 1988 and 1993. The documentary includes five-to-10 minute concert clips as well as Q & A sessions with the musicians.
They performed concerts in various cities in California, and toured the US twice to sold-out crowds. They were the touring support for the Fishbone's 1989 Truth and Soul Tour.  Some members of the band backed Buster Bloodvessel of Bad Manners on a California tour as Buster's All-Stars. The group's relationship with Boston-based ska band Bim Skala Bim, along with Gerald Lokstadt of Spot Productions arranged for the Skatalites saxman, Jamaica's Chief musician Roland Alphonso to make his first solo trip to California in 1989 to record and perform with the Donkey Show. They played their last show at Berkeley International Ska Festival in 1990, in front of nearly 15,000 people in support of Dave Wakeling's group from Birmingham England, the English Beat.
Many former members of the band have gone on to play for some of the most successful modern ska bands. Dave Hillyard was also in the band Hepcat, and is now in the Slackers. Kent and Creedy went on to play in Unsteady. Matt Parker played with the Adjusters, a political soul and ska band in Chicago, as well as the Phoenecians and the Aggrolites in LA, and Thomas Zambrano has gone on to lead and produce Angeles–based ska and reggae pop group Hoodlum Pharaohs.

In an interview from 2001 vocalist Kym Clift spoke of the breakup. "The band retired for many reasons; one being the fact that we were all branching out in different ways creatively as musicians. I know that sounds like such a stereotypical answer, but it's the truth. Oftentimes this leads to successful bands, you know, creating a unique sound from a variety of influences, but unfortunately for the Donkey Show, I feel it was partly responsible for the demise of the band. we were all pretty young, stubborn, and eager to explore new opportunities. Although I was very disappointed, I knew it was for the best. We quit while we were ahead and I would much rather do that then sell out, perform halfheartedly, or play shitty music." Michael.        Brown took part in rehearsals , replacing Ray.    Campbell for about three months. This was.      About a year after 'Bali Island ' came out.

Studio Sessions
Kym Clift: Vocals
Ray Campbell: Vocals
Dave Hillyard: Saxophone
Stanley "Bronco" Farwell: Trombone
Garry Gorrell (early band): Trumpet
Rob Dominguez: Percussion
Matt Parker: Farfisa organ
Kent Graves: Drums
Thomas Zambrano: Bass
Eric Bird (early band) - Bass
Chris "Creedy" Bates: Guitar

Discography
1988 - Mr. Brown 7"
1989 Bali Island E.P.
1998 Just Can't Get Enough of...

References

American ska musical groups
Third-wave ska groups